This is a list of all cricketers who have captained Scotland in an official international match. This includes the ICC Trophy, Under-19 games and One Day Internationals, Twenty20 Internationals. The tables are correct as of the January 2012.

One Day Internationals

Scotland played their first ODI on 16 May 1999.

Twenty20 Internationals

Scotland played their first Twenty20 International against Kenya on 4 February 2010.

ICC Trophy/ICC World Corld Qualifier 

Scotland debuted in the ICC Trophy in the 1996/97 tournament.

Youth One-Day International captains

This is a list of Scottish cricketers who have captained their country in an Under-19's ODI.

Women's Captain

External links
Cricinfo
Scotland's ICC Trophy captains at Cricket Archive 
Scotland's Under-19 captains at Cricket Archive

References

Captains
Captains
Scottish